The men's 110 metres hurdles event at the 2007 Summer Universiade was held on 9–10 August.

Medalists

Results

Heats
Qualification: First 3 of each heat (Q) and the next 4 fastest (q) qualified for the semifinals.

Semifinals
Qualification: First 4 of each semifinal qualified directly (Q) for the final.

Final
Wind: -0.2 m/s

References

Results

110
2007